Sarawut Sirironnachai (born 23 August 1992) is a Thai cyclist, who currently rides for UCI Continental team .

Major results

2011
 1st  Team time trial, Southeast Asian Games
2013
 Southeast Asian Games
1st  Team time trial
6th Road race
2018
 6th Overall Tour of Thailand
 9th Overall Tour of Indonesia
2019
 Southeast Asian Games
1st  Road race
1st  Team road race
1st  Team time trial
 1st Stage 5 Tour of Thailand
 7th Overall Tour de Korea
2020
 National Road Championships
1st  Time trial
7th Road race
 2nd Overall Tour of Thailand
1st  Points classification
1st Stages 3 & 4
2021
 National Road Championships
1st  Road race
2nd Time trial
 3rd Overall Tour of Thailand
1st Stage 3
2022
 Southeast Asian Games
2nd  Criterium

References

External links

1992 births
Living people
Sarawut Sirironnachai
Competitors at the 2019 Southeast Asian Games
Competitors at the 2021 Southeast Asian Games
Southeast Asian Games medalists in cycling
Sarawut Sirironnachai
Sarawut Sirironnachai
Cyclists at the 2018 Asian Games
Sarawut Sirironnachai
Sarawut Sirironnachai
Sarawut Sirironnachai